Adrián Nahuel Torres (born 31 October 1989) is an Argentine professional footballer who plays as a left-back for CSD Flandria.

Career
Torres' career began with Godoy Cruz. In 2009, Torres was signed by Argentine Primera División side Vélez Sarsfield. Twelve months later, Torres was loaned back to Godoy Cruz for the 2010–11 and 2011–12 seasons. He made his professional debut in the Primera División on 8 August 2010 versus Boca Juniors, prior to scoring his first senior goal against the same opponents in February 2011. Torres returned to Vélez Sarsfield in 2012, which preceded a loan to Primera B Nacional's Deportivo Merlo. Twenty-three appearances followed. On 30 June 2013, Fénix signed Torres. He scored three in thirty-eight in 2013–14.

Torres joined fellow Primera B Metropolitana team Atlanta in June 2014. His first appearance arrived on 9 August against former club Fénix, with his first goal for Atlanta coming in his next appearance during a home defeat to Chacarita Juniors on 12 August. He was subsequently selected in fifty matches for them across two campaigns. Torres completed a move to Almagro of Primera B Nacional in January 2016.

Career statistics
.

References

External links
 
 

1989 births
Living people
Sportspeople from Buenos Aires Province
Argentine footballers
Association football defenders
Argentine Primera División players
Primera Nacional players
Primera B Metropolitana players
Club Atlético Vélez Sarsfield footballers
Godoy Cruz Antonio Tomba footballers
Deportivo Merlo footballers
Club Atlético Fénix players
Club Atlético Atlanta footballers
Club Almagro players
Chacarita Juniors footballers
Gimnasia y Esgrima de Jujuy footballers
Flandria footballers